Jatunyurac Caca (possibly from Quechua hatun big, yuraq white, qaqa rock, "big white rock") is a mountain in the southern extensions of the Vilcanota mountain range in the Andes of Peru, about  high. It is situated in the Puno Region,  Melgar Province, Nuñoa District. Jatunyurac Caca lies southwest of the mountain Collpacaja, east of Yaretani and north of a lower mountain named Yuracgaga.

References

Mountains of Puno Region
Mountains of Peru